Rhytidophyllum auriculatum is a species of plant in the family Gesneriaceae, endemic to Hispaniola. According to Liogier it can be found in Haiti (Massif de la Hotte, Massif de la Selle). The flowers are pollinated by bats.

References

External links
 

auriculatum
Endemic flora of Haiti